Félix Alejandro Maradiaga Blandón (born 23 September 1976) is a Nicaraguan academic and political activist. From 2002 to 2006, he was Secretary General of the Ministry of Defense under President Enrique Bolaños. Maradiaga is the founding co-director of the Civil Society Leadership Institute.

A leader of the opposition group Blue and White National Unity, Maradiaga was a pre-candidate for president in the 2021 Nicaraguan general election. On June 8, 2021, he was arrested by the Ortega government.

Childhood 
Felix was born in Jinotega and grew up in Matagalpa. His childhood was marked by the loss of his father, who died in a traffic accident. His mother, a high school teacher who also worked as a merchant to support the family, became the head of the home. The economic situation and the war forced her to make difficult decisions.

At the age of 12 his mother sent him undocumented to the United States and for a period he was in a refugee camp. He was taken in by a Nicaraguan family and lived in his foster parents' care in south Florida for two years.

Education 
Upon returning to Nicaragua in 1990, he resumed his studies in Matagalpa, where he had Archbishop of Managua, Cardinal Leopoldo Brenes, as a mentor who asked him to form the youth ministry of Matagalpa. In this period he learned about non-violence, citizen participation and the strengthening of democracy. After high school he was given a scholarship from a Keiser University division based in San Marcos, Carazo, where he studied political science and international relations.

He later studied for a Masters in Public Administration from Harvard University, where he graduated with honors. In 2009, he studied law and political science at Yale as a member of the Yale World Fellows.

Career 
Between 1997 and 2001 he was the director of the Office for the Reintegration of Ex-combatants, thus contributing to the disarmament, demobilization and reintegration efforts of 2,300 members of the Nicaraguan guerrilla.

In 2004, he became the youngest Secretary General of the Ministry of Defense of Nicaragua, where he promoted the social and economic well-being of ex-combatants, helping hundreds of people to become local entrepreneurs through various initiatives of the agroindustry.

In 2011, he served as academic coordinator of the Civil Society Leadership Institute. Between 2012 and 2016, he co-founded and directed Pioneer Capital Partners, a company focused on promoting investments for Central America and the Caribbean.

In 2017, he was appointed Executive Director of the Institute of Strategic Studies and Public Policy (IEEPP), where he focused his work on investigating the impact of corruption on public administration and the importance of public investment in education, health and development in early childhood to reduce poverty.

Maradiaga is a leader of the Blue and White National Unity (UNAB) movement, one of the major opposition groups formed in the wake of protest and ensuing bloody repression by the Daniel Ortega government that broke out in April 2018. In September 2018, he testified before the UN Security Council about the government repression. A warrant was subsequently issued for his arrest, accusing him of "organized crime and financing of terrorism". That same year, Maradiaga was hospitalized by a group of government supporters in León. Maradiaga later fled the country. He returned to Nicaragua in September 2019 and though police awaited his arrival at the airport, he was not arrested.

He ran for president during 2021 Nicaragua national elections. On June 8, 2021 he was arrested by the Ortega government, the third opposition candidate detained.

Personal life
Maradiaga married Berta Valle in 2006. Since 2018, Valle has been living in exile in the United States with the couple’s daughter, born c. 2014, and her mother-in-law.

On 10 February 2023, along with 221 other political prisoners, Maradiaga was released from prison and expelled to the United States of America after having his nationality revoked by the Nicaraguan government.

References

1976 births
Living people
Nicaraguan activists
Nicaraguan politicians
Harvard Kennedy School alumni
People from Jinotega Department

External links 

 Testimony before the United Nations Security Council in 2018